Bell Craig is a hill in the Ettrick Hills range, part of the Southern Uplands of Scotland. It is part of a ridge that runs parallel to the A708 road on its southern side, with White Coomb in the Moffat Hills directly opposite. The northern slopes are designated as part of the 'Moffat Hills' SSSI and SAC - the summit marks a corner of the area.

Subsidiary SMC Summits

References

Mountains and hills of the Southern Uplands
Mountains and hills of Dumfries and Galloway
Mountains and hills of the Scottish Borders
Donald mountains